A patient under investigation (or a person under investigation) refers to a person who had been in close contact with a person with confirmed infection or/and may have been to place where there is an outbreak or superspreading event. This person exhibits the symptoms of the disease and is required to be tested, and undergo a quarantine or isolation while waiting for the laboratory results. It is a term used by health care workers in classifying patients during evaluation and testing in contact tracing in times of infectious disease outbreaks.

See also

References

External links 
 Centers for Disease Control and Prevention's When Caring for Patients Under Investigation (PUIs) or Patients with Confirmed Ebola Virus Disease (EVD)
 Centers for Disease Control and Prevention's Human Infection with 2019 Novel Coronavirus Person Under Investigation (PUI) and Case Report Form
 Centers for Disease Control and Prevention's Evaluating and Testing Persons for Coronavirus Disease 2019 (COVID-19)
 Illinois Department of Public Health's Case Definitions for MERS-CoV Patient Under Investigation (PUI)
 Eurosurveillance's Differential diagnosis of illness in patients under investigation for the novel coronavirus (SARS-CoV-2), Italy, February 2020

Infectious diseases
Prevention
Medical hygiene